Dichapetalum is a genus in the plant family Dichapetalaceae. The plants are tropical lianas native mainly to tropical regions of Africa, Asia, Malesia, the West Indies, Australia and Latin America. Some species are known to be poisonous due to the presence of toxic fluorinated compounds such as fluorocarboxylic acid and dichapetalins, a unique class of cytotoxic compounds that are only found within this genus.

Species
Accepted by The Plant List, :

 Dichapetalum acuminatum De Wild.	
 Dichapetalum affine (Planch. ex Benth.) Breteler
 Dichapetalum alaotrense Desc.	
 Dichapetalum albidum A.Chev. ex Pellegr.	
 Dichapetalum altescandens Engl.	
 Dichapetalum angolense Chodat		
 Dichapetalum arachnoideum Breteler	
 Dichapetalum arenarium Breteler
 Dichapetalum asplundeanum Prance	
 Dichapetalum axillare Woodson	
 Dichapetalum bangii (Didr.) Engl.
 Dichapetalum barbatum Breteler	
 Dichapetalum barbosae Torre	
 Dichapetalum barteri Engl.	
 Dichapetalum beckii Fern.Casas	
 Dichapetalum beilschmiedioides Breteler	
 Dichapetalum bellum Breteler	
Dichapetalum berendinae 
 Dichapetalum bernalii Prance	
 Dichapetalum bocageanum (Henr.) Engl.	
 Dichapetalum bodyi De Wild.	
 Dichapetalum bojeri (Tul.) Engl.	
 Dichapetalum braunii Engl. & K.Krause	
 Dichapetalum brenesii Standl.	
 Dichapetalum bullatum Standl. & Steyerm.	
 Dichapetalum chalotii Pellegr.	
 Dichapetalum chlorinum (Tul.) Engl.	
 Dichapetalum choristilum Engl.	
 Dichapetalum coelhoi Prance	
 Dichapetalum coelhoorum Prance	
 Dichapetalum congoense Engl. & Ruhland	
 Dichapetalum crassifolium Chodat	
 Dichapetalum cubense (Poepp.) M. Gómez	
Dichapetalum cymosum 
 Dichapetalum cymulosum (Oliv.) Engl.	
 Dichapetalum deflexum (Klotzsch) Engl.	
 Dichapetalum dewevrei De Wild. & T.Durand	
 Dichapetalum dewildei Breteler	
 Dichapetalum dictyospermum Breteler	
 Dichapetalum donnell-smithii Engl.	
 Dichapetalum edule Engl.	
 Dichapetalum eickii Ruhland	
 Dichapetalum fadenii Breteler	
 Dichapetalum filicaule Breteler		
 Dichapetalum findouense Breteler	
 Dichapetalum foreroi Prance	
 Dichapetalum froesii Prance	
 Dichapetalum fructuosum Hiern	
 Dichapetalum gabonense Engl.	
 Dichapetalum gassitae Breteler	
 Dichapetalum gelonioides (Roxb.) Engl.	
 Dichapetalum geminostellatum Breteler	
 Dichapetalum gentryi Prance	
 Dichapetalum germainii Hauman	
 Dichapetalum gilletii De Wild.	
 Dichapetalum glomeratum Engl.	
 Dichapetalum grandifolium Ridl.	
 Dichapetalum grayumii Prance	
 Dichapetalum griffithii (Hook.f.) Engl.	
 Dichapetalum hammelii Prance	
 Dichapetalum helferianum (Kurz) Pierre	
 Dichapetalum heudelotii (Planch. ex Oliv.) Baill.	
 Dichapetalum inaequale Breteler		
 Dichapetalum inopinatum Al.Rodr. & Kriebel	
 Dichapetalum insigne Engl.	
 Dichapetalum integripetalum Engl.	
 Dichapetalum klaineanum Brette		
 Dichapetalum korupinum Breteler	
 Dichapetalum latifolium Baill.	
 Dichapetalum laurocerasus (Hook.f.) Engl.	
 Dichapetalum letouzeyi Breteler	
 Dichapetalum leucocarpum Breteler	
 Dichapetalum leucosia (Spreng.) Engl.	
 Dichapetalum librevillense Pellegr.	
 Dichapetalum lindicum Breteler	
 Dichapetalum lofense Breteler	
 Dichapetalum longipetalum (Turcz.) Engl.	
 Dichapetalum lujae De Wild. & T.Durand	
 Dichapetalum macrocarpum Engl.	
 Dichapetalum madagascariense 
 Dichapetalum mathisii Breteler	
 Dichapetalum melanocladum Breteler	
 Dichapetalum mexicanum Prance	
 Dichapetalum minutiflorum Engl. & Ruhland	
 Dichapetalum mombuttense Engl.	
 Dichapetalum montanum Breteler	
 Dichapetalum moralesii Prance	
 Dichapetalum morenoi Prance	
 Dichapetalum mossambicense (Klotzsch) Engl.	
 Dichapetalum mundense Engl.	
 Dichapetalum neglectum Breteler	
 Dichapetalum nervatum Cuatrec.	
 Dichapetalum nevermannianum Standl. & Valerio	
 Dichapetalum nyangense Pellegr.	
 Dichapetalum obanense (Baker f.) Hutch. & Dalziel	
 Dichapetalum oblongum (Hook.f. ex Benth.) Engl.	
 Dichapetalum odoratum Baill.	
 Dichapetalum oliganthum Breteler	
 Dichapetalum pallidum (Oliv.) Engl.	
Dichapetalum papuanum  – Qld Australia, New Guinea, Solomon Is., Moluccas
 Dichapetalum parvifolium Engl.	
 Dichapetalum pauper Rizzini	
 Dichapetalum pedicellatum K.Krause	
 Dichapetalum pedunculatum (DC.) Baill.	
 Dichapetalum petaloideum Breteler	
 Dichapetalum pierrei Pellegr.	
 Dichapetalum platyphyllum Merr.		
 Dichapetalum potamophilum Breteler	
 Dichapetalum prancei Fern.Casas	
 Dichapetalum pulchrum Breteler	
 Dichapetalum rabiense Breteler	
 Dichapetalum reliquum Kriebel & Al.Rodr.	
 Dichapetalum reticulatum Engl.	
 Dichapetalum rhodesicum Sprague & Hutch.	
 Dichapetalum rudatisii Engl.
 Dichapetalum ruficeps Breteler	
 Dichapetalum rufum (Tul.) Engl.	
 Dichapetalum rugosum (Vahl) Prance	
 Dichapetalum ruhlandii Engl.	
 Dichapetalum schulzii Prance	
 Dichapetalum scorpioideum Leenh.	
 Dichapetalum sessiliflorum Leenh.	
 Dichapetalum setosum Leenh.	
 Dichapetalum sordidum (Hook.f.) Leenh.	
 Dichapetalum spruceanum Baill.		
 Dichapetalum staminellatum Breteler	
 Dichapetalum staudtii Engl.	
 Dichapetalum steenisii Leenh.	
 Dichapetalum steyermarkii Prance	
 Dichapetalum stipulatum J.F.Macbr.	
 Dichapetalum stuhlmannii Engl.	
 Dichapetalum sumbense Breteler	
 Dichapetalum tenerum Leenh.	
 Dichapetalum tenuifolium (King) Engl.	
 Dichapetalum tetrastachyum Breteler	
 Dichapetalum thollonii Pellegr.	
Dichapetalum timorense  – SE Asia, Malesia, Qld Australia
 Dichapetalum tomentosum Engl.		
 Dichapetalum toxicarium (G.Don) Baill.	
 Dichapetalum tricapsulare (Blanco) Merr.	
 Dichapetalum trichocephalum Breteler	
 Dichapetalum ugandense M.B.Moss	
 Dichapetalum umbellatum Chodat	
 Dichapetalum unguiculatum Engl.	
 Dichapetalum virchowii (O.Hoffm. & Hildebr.) Engl.	
 Dichapetalum vitiense (Seem.) Engl.	
 Dichapetalum vondrozanum Desc.	
 Dichapetalum witianum Breteler		
 Dichapetalum zenkeri Engl.	
 Dichapetalum zeylanicum Kosterm.

References

 
Malpighiales genera